Bob "Whipper" Watson (born April 6, 1970) is a former goaltender for the Toronto Rock in the National Lacrosse League and is regarded as one of the best goaltenders ever to play indoor lacrosse Watson won six NLL Championships with the Rock, and was named Championship Game MVP in both 2003 and 2011. Watson was named NLL Goaltender of the Year in 2001 and again in 2008. After 13 years in Toronto and winning 6 Championships, Watson decided to retire to devote his time to family and a new job with the Waterloo Regional Police Service.

Watson considered retirement after the 2010 season when the Rock lost to the Washington Stealth in the Championship game, but he later decided to come back for one more season. Mid-way through the 2011 season, Watson announced that it would be his last in the NLL. The Rock made it back to the Championship and in his final NLL game, Watson was named Championship Game MVP for the second time in his career as the Rock beat the Stealth 8-7 in a rematch of the 2010 game.

Bob Watson was the only 2011 inductee into the NLL Hall of Fame. He received 86% of the Hall entry votes, the only player that year to surpass the mandatory 75%.  He was the third goaltender to be entered into the NLL Hall of Fame.

Statistics

NLL
Reference:

Awards

References

1970 births
Canadian lacrosse players
Canadian police officers
Living people
National Lacrosse League All-Stars
National Lacrosse League major award winners
Sportspeople from Guelph
Toronto Rock players